Shahrak-e Ardkapan (also Romanized as Shahrak-e Ārdkapān) is a village in Bakan Rural District, Hasanabad District, Eqlid County, Fars Province, Iran. At the 2006 census, its population was 390, in 79 families.

References 

Populated places in Eqlid County